Elizabeth Dean Lail (born March 25, 1992) is an American actress. She played the recurring role of Anna in the fantasy adventure series Once Upon a Time (2014), and starred as Amy Hughes in the supernatural series Dead of Summer (2016). Lail starred as Guinevere Beck in the psychological thriller series You (2018–2019), and as Jenny Banks in the NBC drama series Ordinary Joe (2021–2022).

Early life
Lail was born in Williamson County, Texas, and grew up in Asheboro, North Carolina. After graduating from Asheboro High School in 2010, she attended the University of North Carolina School of the Arts, graduating in May 2014.

Career
Lail mostly worked in student short film productions, such as Model Airplane and Without, while in university from 2011 to 2014. She had moved to New York City to pursue stage work when she landed an audition for ABC's Once Upon a Time, after which she was cast as Anna in the fourth season of the series, released in 2014. Lail was cast in a starring role in the 2016 Freeform horror series Dead of Summer, playing the role of camp counselor Amy.

In 2017, Lail was cast as Guinevere Beck in the Lifetime/Netflix television series You, opposite Penn Badgley and Shay Mitchell. Released in 2018, she received a nomination for Best Actress in Streaming Presentation at the 45th Saturn Awards. Lail reprised her role as Guinevere Beck in guest appearances on both the second and fourth season of You. Lail played the lead in the 2019 horror film Countdown.

In March 2021, Lail was set to play the titular role of Mack in the comedy film Mack & Rita opposite Diane Keaton; she also joined the cast of the HBO Max teen drama Gossip Girl, in the recurring role of Lola Morgan. The same month, it was revealed that Lail had joined the cast of the NBC drama series Ordinary Joe.

Personal life 
In April 2021, Lail married dentist Nieku Manshadi.

Filmography

Awards and nominations

References

External links
 
 

1992 births
21st-century American actresses
Actresses from North Carolina
American film actresses
American television actresses
Living people
People from Asheboro, North Carolina
People from Williamson County, Texas
University of North Carolina School of the Arts alumni